is a Japanese drama produced by Fuji Television starring actress Maki Horikita.  The producer, director, and screenwriter for the series consists of the same team that created the successful 2007 drama Hanazakari no Kimitachi e.  The series ran from Tuesday, April 14 to June 23, 2009, in the 9:00 PM time slot.

Plot summary
Chisato Mineta (Maki Horikita), a 20-year-old homeless girl who moves about from parks to net cafes.  
Her mother died of illness, and when her father disappears after earning an incredible 100 million Yen debt, she is chased out of her home. Chisato spends her life running from debt collectors living as a homeless person. One day she gets caught by debt-collectors to force her to pay the 100 million Yen debt her father left behind. Where then a president of a huge toy company (Okura Shinzo) comes and rescues her by paying off the debt but then tricks her into marrying him. She then finds out that he only has one month to live and is in need of a "wife" to take care of him. If she stays married to him then she does not have to pay back the debt but if she leaves then all the money has to be returned immediately in cash.

A month later, she finds out that the president actually has more conditions than just being his wife. She must also live in the Trick Heart Castle with his six sons, all adopted to be successors of the company, and act as their mother for three months in order for the debt to be fully paid. However, each son has hidden himself away from the rest of the family and treat each other as mere strangers that live in the same household. Will Chisato be able to open up their hearts and turn these strangers into a loving family?

Cast

Audience Rating

References

External links
 Fuji TV Official Site - Atashinchi no Danshi

2009 Japanese television series debuts
2009 Japanese television series endings
Japanese drama television series
Fuji TV dramas